Talovinka is a rural locality (a settlement) in Aktyubinsky Selsoviet of Volodarsky District, Astrakhan Oblast, Russia. The population was 158 as of 2010. There are 2 streets.

Geography 
Talovinka is located on the Kornevaya River, 4 km south of Volodarsky (the district's administrative centre) by road. Kzyl-Tan is the nearest rural locality.

References 

Rural localities in Volodarsky District, Astrakhan Oblast